Ojie Edoburun (born 2 June 1996) is a British track and field sprint athlete who competes in the 100m and 200-meter dash events. He  was a member of the England 4 x 400 metre relay team that won gold at the 2022 Commonwealth Games, and is a European junior and under-23 champion in the 100 metres. He competed at the 2013 World Youth Championships where he won a silver medal behind China's Mo Youxue in a then career best time of 10.35.

Personal bests

References

External links

1996 births
Living people
Athletes from London
British male sprinters
English male sprinters
British Athletics Championships winners
Athletes (track and field) at the 2022 Commonwealth Games
Commonwealth Games gold medallists for England
Commonwealth Games medallists in athletics
Medallists at the 2022 Commonwealth Games